Dunstaffnage can refer to:

 Dunbeg, the Scottish village formerly known as Dunstaffnage
 Dunstaffnage Castle